Sandy River Reservoir is a  water supply impoundment located slightly east of the town of Farmville (and South of Rice) in Prince Edward County. The Sandy River Reservoir is one of the newest lakes in Virginia with construction completed in 1994 and fishing opened in 1996. The reservoir was built and is owned by the county of Prince Edward with fisheries management responsibilities belonging to the Virginia Department of Game and Inland Fisheries.

External links
 VDGIF page

Reservoirs in Virginia
Bodies of water of Prince Edward County, Virginia